The 2021–22 season was the 36th season in the existence of ES Troyes AC and the club's first season back in the top flight of French football. In addition to the domestic league, Troyes participated in this season's edition of the Coupe de France.

Players

First-team squad

Other players under contract

On loan

Transfers

In

Out

Pre-season and friendlies

Competitions

Overall record

Ligue 1

League table

Results summary

Results by round

Matches
The league fixtures were announced on 25 June 2021.

Coupe de France

Statistics

Goalscorers

References

ES Troyes AC seasons
Troyes